Jasnières is an Appellation d'Origine Contrôlée (AOC) for white wine from the Loire Valley region of France.

Profile

Jasnières wines are dry white wines produced from Chenin blanc grapes. Red wines are made from Pineau d’Aunis and Cabernet Franc.

References

Further reading
 Michel Mastrojanni: Les Vins de France (guide vert solar). Éditions Solar, Paris 1992 - 1994 - 1998.

Sarthe
Loire AOCs